Czech Republic competed at the 1994 Winter Paralympics in Lillehammer, Norway. 6 competitors from Czech Republic won a single bronze medal and finished joint 22nd and last in the medal table with Belgium, Estonia and Liechtenstein.

See also 
 Czech Republic at the Paralympics
 Czech Republic at the 1994 Winter Olympics

References 

1994
1994 in Czech sport
Nations at the 1994 Winter Paralympics